Eriogonum crocatum, the Conejo buckwheat or saffron buckwheat, is a species of Eriogonum, or wild buckwheat. It is endemic to the Conejo Valley and surrounding regions in Ventura County, California It grows on open, dry hillsides, often in crags in rock faces.

Description
Its foliage is a striking silvery green, with woolly leaves.

The Conejo buckwheat flowers from April–August, bearing clusters of tiny bright, sulfur yellow flowers. It has no dormancy period.

Cultivation
Eriogonum crocatum has entered limited cultivation in native plant gardens and xeriscaping. It likes sun and is drought tolerant. It rarely exceeds 0.5 m in height and 1 m in width, so it makes an excellent accent plant. It thrives in clay soils and survives some other soils. It is reportedly difficult to cultivate outside of the southern California area. It can tolerate light freezes.

References

External links

Jepson Manual treatment: Eriogonum crocatum
Eriogonum crocatum — U.C.Photo gallery

crocatum
Endemic flora of California
Natural history of the California chaparral and woodlands
Natural history of the Santa Monica Mountains
Natural history of Ventura County, California
Garden plants of North America
Drought-tolerant plants